David Mciwa Mallole (born 26 December 1955) is a Tanzanian CCM politician and Member of Parliament for Dodoma Town constituency since 2010 to 2015.

References

1955 births
Living people
Chama Cha Mapinduzi MPs
Tanzanian MPs 2010–2015
St. Peter's Seminary, Morogoro alumni
St. Augustine University of Tanzania alumni
Pontifical Urban University alumni